Walter Staudinger (January 24, 1898 in Munich - August 31, 1964) was a German SS-Gruppenführer and Generalleutnant of the Waffen SS.

World War I
Walter Staudinger's father, August Staudinger was the master bookbinder. Staudinger had a younger brother, Raimund (1900–1943). In Munich he attended Luitpold Gymnasium. At the start of World War I, in January 1915, he volunteered and joined the army in the division of the Royal Bavarian 7th Infantry Regiment “Prince Leopold”. He attended military training for six months. In the summer of 1915, he was transferred to the 10th Bavarian Mountain Battery of the 6th Royal Bavarian Landwehr Division. Staudinger fought on both the western and eastern fronts. He took part in the Battle of Verdun and the battles for the Red Tower Pass. After an officer training course in the spring of 1918, he was sent to the replacement division of the Royal Bavarian 9th Field Artillery Regiment, where he was till the end of the war. In mid-December 1918 he was discharged from the army with the rank of lieutenant in the reserve.

On December 15, 1918, he entered the police force and initially served in the war usury office in Munich. In the spring of 1919 he also joined worked for the Freikorps. During the Kapp Putsch coup in March 1920, he volunteered in the Reichswehr Army. In 1920 became work for the Munich police headquarters. He joined the Nazi Party in 1920. In November 1923 he took part on the Hitler's Beer Hall Putsch and was awarded the Blood Order. He was at the start of Nazi Germany with Hitler. When the Nazi party seized power in May 1933 he joined again with (membership No. 3,201,960). This was due to the failed coup and the interim Nazi party ban. He departed after the failed coup, as membership would have jeopardized his police career. After the coup, he was temporarily given a leave of absence from the police force.

World War II
With Hitler and Nazi Party in power, in April 1933, he worked for two months as a Presidential Secretary in the Munich police headquarters. In June 1933 he became a police captain under Chief of Police, August Schneidhuber. In 1933 he joined the National Socialist People's Welfare and Reichskolonialbund -Reich Colonial Association.

In November 1934 Staudinger joined the SS-Schutzstaffel (SS No. 242.652) and was transferred to Berlin. There joined the staff of the Reichsführer-SS, and in 1934 he was briefly the adjutant to Heinrich Himmler. He then became in the adjutant to Sicherheitsdienst chief Reinhard Heydrich. Part of his duties was head of motor vehicle officers of the Gestapo Secret State Police Office. Staudinger then from October 26, 1935, to September 1939 became the head of Department IV (technical department) at the Gestapo Office in Berlin. At the Gestapo headquarters, he was responsible for all motor vehicle, aviation, communications and the technical weapons department. From August 1936 to September 1939 he also was head of Section V9 in the Administration and Law Office of the Main Office of the Security Police . From August to September 1939 he also Hauptamt of Group K in the command office of the Main Office of the Ordnungspolizei in the Sicherheitsdienst Main Office.

As World War II started he completed an artillery training course and was accepted into the SS-Verfügungstruppe troops. Starting in October 1939 he was commander of the II SS artillery division in Munich and then from April 1940 commander of the IV light artillery division. Next with the SS artillery regiment of 1st SS Panzer Division Leibstandarte SS Adolf Hitler. From April to June 1943 he was a member of the deployment staff of the I SS Panzer Corps, where he was deployed as an artillery commander from July 1943 to October 1944. In August 1944 he was injured in combat and hospitalized till December 1944. From October 1944 to May 1945 he was Higher Artillery Commander in the 6th Panzer Army.

Post War

At the end of the war, he was captured and was interned in Salzburg on May 11, 1945. He testified in the Malmedy massacre trial at the Nuremberg Trials for Sepp Dietrich, to whom he was subordinate during the war. Dietrich was convicted of war crimes at the Malmedy massacre trial, conducted by the U.S. military tribunal. He received a life sentence, but was released from prison on October 22, 1955. After Staudinger's denazification, he was released from the internment hospital in Garmisch at the end of April 1948. He then moved back to Munich and worked for the Sebastian Schramm company, a photographic agency and School from May to November 1948. In 1949 he was unemployed for a year.
On June 26, 1945, June 26, 1945 was interrogate on Russian artillery.

In 1951 the Gehlen Organization (OG) also collected information about the various soldiers' associations, especially right-wing extremist organizations. Information about former leaders of the Waffen SS was also recorded and evaluated. In a report by the Gehlen in April 1951, Staudinger was classified as prominent representatives the Nazi Party, along with seven other SS and police leader, including Otto Skorzeny, Gunter d'Alquen, Karl Maria Demelhuber, Paul Hausser and Felix Steiner. According the report, Staudinger was noted as the one setting the tone in the Munich SS Leadership, as a representative of Germany's neutrality policy and a sharp critic of Johann von Kielmansegg, Hans Speidel and Oster because of their attitude on 20 July plot on Hitler. The report also noted that Staudinger and his Munich comrades had positioned themselves within the former Waffen-SS leadership against Skorzeny and Steiner, but on the more moderate side of Hausser. Staudinger, married to Elsa Schmidt in April 1923 and is the father of two daughters. He died in August 1964 as a result of heart failure.

Ranks
Staudinger's ranks in the police and Waffen-SS during the Second World War:

October 1939 	SS-Sturmbannführer of the SS disposal force*
May 1940 	SS-Obersturmbannführer of the Waffen-SS
September 1940 	Lieutenant Colonel of the Security Police
January 1941 	Standartenführer of the Waffen SS
October 1942 	SS Oberführer of the Waffen SS
June 1943 	SS Brigade Leader and Major General of the Waffen SS
November 1944 	SS group leader and lieutenant general of the Waffen SS

Awards
Awards:
    Iron Cross 2nd class (1917) with clasp (1940) 
    Iron Cross 1st Class (1940) 
    German Cross in Gold (1942)
    Star of Romania with swords on the ribbon of the Order of Military Virtue III. Class (Commander's Cross) (1942) 
    Bulgarian Order of Valor III. Class, 1st level (1942) 
    Medal Winter Battle in the East 1941/42 (1942)

See also 

Register of SS leaders in general's rank

References

1898 births
1946 deaths
SS-Obergruppenführer
German Army personnel of World War I
German people of World War II
SS and Police Leaders
Nazis who participated in the Beer Hall Putsch
Waffen-SS personnel
Military personnel from Munich